The 25th Army (German: 25. Armee) was a World War II field army of the German Army. It had the highest ordinal number of any of the numbered German armies.

History
The 25th Army was formed on 10 November 1944 in the Netherlands, from the staffs of the Armed Forces Commander of the Netherlands and Armeeabteilung Kleffel (previously known as "Narva Task Force"). The designation as "army" was a deception measure for most of the command's existence, as it did not command more than three divisions until April 1945, during the final days of its existence.

The 25th Army held the northernmost position of the Nazi German front line of the Western Front for less than six months in late 1944 and early 1945, with its western flank anchored on the North Sea and its eastern flank adjoining the 1st Parachute Army. Defending the western Netherlands along the Meuse (Maas), from the North Sea to Arnhem, its primary opponent was the First Canadian Army.

Its first, and longest commander was Wehrmachtbefehlshaber Friedrich Christiansen, Supreme Commander of Reichskommissariat Niederlande. He was followed by General der Infanterie Günther Blumentritt, then General der Kavallerie Philipp Kleffel. From November 1944 until April 1945, the 25th Army was subordinated to Army Group H and subsequently was transferred to the Northwest High Command (Oberbefehlshaber Nordwest).

On 7 April 1945, the 25th Army was converted into the Netherlands High Command (Oberbefehlshaber Niederlande), under command of Generaloberst Johannes Blaskowitz, to defend Fortress Holland (Festung Holland), the area west of the New Dutch Waterline.

Two days after the surrender of the Northwest High Command to the British 21st Army Group, Generaloberst Blaskowitz surrendered his command to I Canadian Corps' Lieutenant-General Charles Foulkes at Wageningen on 5 May 1945 (documents typed and signed the next day, as no typewriter had been available), effectively ending the war in the Netherlands.

Commanders

References

Sources
 Stacey, C. P. (1960). The Victory Campaign, The Queen's Printer and Controller of Stationery, Ottawa.
 Tessin, Georg (1976).  Verbände und Truppen der deutschen Wehrmacht und Waffen-SS im Zweiten Weltkrieg 1939-1945 (Volume IV), Biblio Verlag, Osnabrück.  .

25
Military units and formations established in 1944
Military units and formations disestablished in 1945